The Sindh-Sipahi (Sindhi: سنڌي سپاهی ) are a Muslim community found in the province of Sindh in Pakistan and state of Rajasthan in India.

History and origin
The Sindh-Sipahi originally belonged to the family of Chandravanshi Rajputs. They are said to have converted to Islam, at the time of the conquest of Sindh by the Arabs, around 8th Century A.D. The Sindhi Sipahi form a large part of the Muslim Rajputs  population of Marwar and Mewar. According to their traditions, they were Chauhan and Bhati Rajputs who converted to Islam in the Middle Ages. They are concentrated in Mallani, Sheo, Sanchor in Marwar and in Udaipur.

They are sub-divided into various tribes. They have a common origin with the Sindhi Rajput tribes of Pakistan.

Present circumstances

The community are now mainly settled agriculturist, although many are still herdsmen. Many of their villages are situated in the Thar Desert, and are affected by environmental changes. They have their own Panchayat (community council), which deals with disputes within the community. The community are Sunni Hanafi Muslims, and speak the Marwari and Mewari dialects of Rajasthani, Sindhi and Urdu.

Distribution
The Sindh-Sipahi were initially settled in Tharparkar and Sanghar districts of Sindh. But now a majority of them resides in Karachi, Hyderabad, Shahdadpur, Mirpur Khas and Sukkur. They are found mainly in the western districts of Rajasthan state, such as Bikaner, Jaisalmer, Barmer, Churu, and Jodhpur.

See also
 Sindhi people
 Silawat

References

Sindhi tribes
Social groups of Pakistan
Social groups of Rajasthan
Rajput clans of Sindh
Muslim communities of Rajasthan
Sindhi tribes in India